Malang Balouch (born 10 August 1948) is a Pakistani boxer. He competed in the men's light welterweight event at the 1972 Summer Olympics.

References

1948 births
Living people
Pakistani male boxers
Olympic boxers of Pakistan
Boxers at the 1972 Summer Olympics
Place of birth missing (living people)
Boxers at the 1974 Asian Games
Asian Games competitors for Pakistan
Light-welterweight boxers
20th-century Pakistani people